Crossgate Farmhouse is a Grade II listed farmhouse in the civil parish of Werrington, Cornwall, England, UK. It was perhaps built in the 18th century and was remodelled in the early 19th century.

References

Farms in Cornwall
Grade II listed buildings in Cornwall